The 1920 Currie Cup was the 12th edition of the Currie Cup, the premier domestic rugby union competition in South Africa.

See also

 Currie Cup

References

1920
1920 in South African rugby union
Currie